Raymond Jungles Inc. is a landscape architecture firm located in Miami, Florida.  The company was founded in 1982 by Raymond Jungles and has maintained an international presence in landscape architecture focusing on residential, hospitality, master plan, and public work.

References

Horticultural companies of the United States
Companies based in Miami
Architecture firms based in Florida
1982 establishments in Florida
Companies established in 1982